Buona giornata is a 2012 Italian comedy film directed by Carlo Vanzina.

Cast

References

External links

2012 films
Films directed by Carlo Vanzina
2010s Italian-language films
2012 comedy films
Italian comedy films
2010s Italian films